Nationality words link to articles with information on the nation's poetry or literature (for instance, Irish or France).

Events
 June 5 – Samuel Taylor Coleridge, living at Nether Stowey in the Quantock Hills, renews his friendship with William Wordsworth and Wordsworth's sister, Dorothy, who take a house nearby.
 August – The British Home Office sends an agent to Nether Stowey to investigate Coleridge and Wordsworth who are suspected of being French spies.
 October – Coleridge composes Kubla Khan in an opium-induced dream and writes down only a fragment of it on waking.
 November – Wordsworth suggests to Coleridge the theme of The Rime of the Ancient Mariner on a walk in the Quantocks.
 William Blake illustrates Edward Young's Night-Thoughts.

Works published

United Kingdom
 Samuel Taylor Coleridge, Poems ... Second Edition
 William Drennan, The Wake of William Orr
 George Dyer, The Poet's Fate
 Alexander Pope, The Works of Alexander Pope, edited by Joseph Warton, posthumous
 Charlotte Smith, Elegaic Sonnets, and Other Poems, Volume 2, sequel to Elegaic Sonnets 1784
 Elizabeth Sophia Tomlins and Sir Thomas Edlyne Tomlins, Tributes of Affection by a Lady and her Brother
 Mary Wollstonecraft, "On Poetry, and Our Relish for the Beauties of Nature", Monthly Magazine (April 1797), criticism

United States

 Sarah Wentworth Morton, publishing under the name "Philenia", Beacon Hill: A Local Poem, Historic and Descriptive, on the American Revolution; conventional verse in neoclassical form
 Robert Treat Paine Jr. "The Ruling Passion", the Harvard Phi Beta Kappa poem for this year

Works wrongly dated this year
 Robert Southey, Poems, actually published in 1796, although the title page states "1797"

Births
Death years link to the corresponding "[year] in poetry" article:
 January 10 – Annette von Droste-Hülshoff (died 1848), German
 March 27 – Alfred de Vigny (died 1863), French poet, playwright and novelist
 August 30 – Mary Shelley, née Godwin (died 1851), English novelist, short story writer, dramatist, essayist, biographer, travel writer and poet
 October 13 – William Motherwell (died 1835), Scottish
 December 13 – Heinrich Heine (died 1856), German
 December 27 – Mirza Ghalib (died 1869), Indian classical Urdu and Persian poet
 Also:
 James Wallis Eastburn (died 1819), American
 George Moses Horton (died 1883), African-American

Deaths
Birth years link to the corresponding "[year] in poetry" article:
 March 18 – Friedrich Wilhelm Gotter (born 1746), German poet and dramatist
 April 7 – William Mason (born 1724), English poet, editor and gardener
 June 28 – George Keate (born 1729), English poet and writer
 Also:
 Joseph Friedrich Engelschall (born 1739), German poet
 Wang Zhenyi (born 1768), Chinese Qing dynasty female poet and astronomer
 Yuan Mei (born 1716), Chinese Qing dynasty poet, scholar, artist and gastronome
 Molla Panah Vagif (born 1717), Azerbaijani poet

See also

Poetry

Notes

18th-century poetry
Poetry